Section modulus is a geometric property for a given cross-section used in the design of beams or flexural members. Other geometric properties used in design include area for tension and shear, radius of gyration for compression, and second moment of area and polar second moment of area for stiffness. Any relationship between these properties is highly dependent on the shape in question. Equations for the section moduli of common shapes are given below. There are two types of section moduli, the elastic section modulus and the plastic section modulus. The section moduli of different profiles can also be found as numerical values for common profiles in tables listing properties of such.

Notation 
North American and British/Australian convention reverse the usage of S & Z. Elastic modulus is S in North America, but Z in Britain/Australia, and vice versa for the plastic modulus. Eurocode 3 (EN 1993 - Steel Design) resolves this by using W for both, but distinguishes between them by the use of subscripts - Wel and Wpl.

Elastic section modulus 
For general design, the elastic section modulus is used, applicable up to the yield point for most metals and other common materials.

The elastic section modulus is defined as S = I / y, where I is the second moment of area (or area moment of inertia, not to be confused with moment of inertia) and y is the distance from the neutral axis to any given fibre. It is often reported using y = c, where c is the distance from the neutral axis to the most extreme fibre, as seen in the table below. It is also often used to determine the yield moment (My) such that My = S ⋅ σy, where σy is the yield strength of the material.

Plastic section modulus 
The plastic section modulus is used for materials where elastic yielding is acceptable and plastic behavior is assumed to be an acceptable limit. Designs generally strive to ultimately remain below the plastic limit to avoid permanent deformations, often comparing the plastic capacity against amplified forces or stresses.

The plastic section modulus depends on the location of the plastic neutral axis (PNA).The PNA is defined as the axis that splits the cross section such that the compression force from the area in compression equals the tension force from the area in tension. So, for sections with constant, and equal compressive and tensile yielding stress, the area above and below the PNA will be equal, but for composite sections, this is not necessarily the case.

The plastic section modulus is the sum of the areas of the cross section on each side of the PNA (which may or may not be equal) multiplied by the distance from the local centroids of the two areas to the PNA:

The Plastic Section Modulus is not the 'First moment of area'. Both relate to the calculation of the centroid, but Plastic Section Modulus is the Sum of all areas on both sides of PNA (Plastic Neutral Axis) and multiplied with the distances from the centroid of the corresponding areas to the centroid of the cross section, while the First moment of area is calculated based on either side of the "considering point" of the cross section and it is different along the cross section and depends on the point of consideration.

The plastic section modulus is used to calculate the plastic moment, Mp, or full capacity of a cross-section.  The two terms are related by the yield strength of the material in question, Fy, by Mp = Fy ⋅ Z.  Plastic section modulus and elastic section modulus are related by a shape factor which can be denoted by k, used for an indication of capacity beyond elastic limit of material. This could be shown mathematically with the formula :-

Shape factor for a rectangular section is 1.5.

Use in structural engineering 

Though generally section modulus is calculated for the extreme tensile or compressive fibres in a bending beam, often compression is the most critical case due to onset of flexural torsional (F/T) buckling. Generally (except for brittle materials like concrete) tensile extreme fibres have a higher allowable stress or capacity than compressive fibres.

In the case of T-sections if there are tensile fibres at the bottom of the T they may still be more critical than the compressive fibres at the top due to a generally much larger distance from the neutral axis so despite having a higher allowable stress the elastic section modulus is also lower. In this case F/T buckling must still be assessed as the beam length and restraints may result in reduced compressive member bending allowable stress or capacity.

There may also be a number of different critical cases that require consideration, such as there being different values for orthogonal and principal axes and in the case of unequal angle sections in the principal axes there is a section modulus for each corner.

For a conservative (safe) design, civil structural engineers are often concerned with the combination of the highest load (tensile or compressive) and lowest elastic section modulus for a given section station along a beam, although if the loading is well understood one can take advantage of different section modulus for tension and compression to get more out of the design. For aeronautical and space applications where designs must be much less conservative for weight saving, structural testing is often required to ensure safety as reliance on structural analysis alone is more difficult (and expensive) to justify.

See also 
 Beam theory
 List of area moments of inertia
 Second moment of area

References 

Structural analysis